Melanchlaeni (meaning "black-cloaks") may refer to three ancient tribes.

The first was a nomad tribe, the name of which first appears in Hecataeus (ap. Steph. B., Fr. 154, ed. Klausen). In the geography of Herodotus (iv. 20,100--103,107) they are found occupying the districts east of the Androphagi, and north of the Royal Scythians, 20 days' journey from the Palus Maeotis; over above them were lakes and lands unknown to man. It has been conjectured that Herodotus may refer, through some hearsay statement, to the lakes Ladoga and Onega. There has been considerable discussion among geographers as to the position which should be assigned to this tribe: it is of course impossible to fix this with any accuracy; but there would seem to be reason to place them as far north as the sources of the Volga, or even further. (Schafarik, Slav. Alt. vol. i. p. 295.) Herodotus expressly says that they did not belong to the Scythian-Scolotic stock, although their customs were the same. The name, the Black-cloaks, like that of their cannibal neighbours, the Anthropophagi, was applied to them by the Greeks, and was not a corrupted form of any indigenous appellation. 

The second people bearing this name is mentioned by Scylax of Caryanda (p. 32) as a tribe of Pontus. Pomponius Mela (i. 19. § 4) and Pliny (vi. 5) coincide with Scylax, who speaks of two rivers flowing through their territory, the Metasoris (Μετάσωρις), probably the same as the Thessyris (Θέσσυρις, Ptol. v. 9. § § 10, 30: Kamisiliar), and the Aegipius (Αἰγίπιος: Kentichli). Dionysius Periegetes (v. 309) places this people (or perhaps confuses the prior) on the Borysthenes, and Ptolemy (v. 9. § 19) between the river Rha and the Hippici Montes, in Asiatic Sarmatia; but it would be a great error to found any observation concerning these ancient northern tribes upon either the Roman writers or Ptolemy, or to confuse the picture set before us by these geographers, and the more correct delineations of Herodotus. 

The third people were the Melanchlaeni of Ammianus (xxii. 8. § 31), which were the Alani.

See also
European Scythian campaign of Darius I
Melanchlaeni and Cheremis (Mari)

References

Ancient peoples of Russia
History of Pontus